The 1996–97 NBA season was the Mavericks' 17th season in the National Basketball Association. The Mavericks had the ninth pick in the 1996 NBA draft, and selected Samaki Walker out of Louisville. In the off-season, the team signed free agents Chris Gatling, Oliver Miller, and former Mavs guard Derek Harper, and acquired Eric Montross from the Boston Celtics, and signed undrafted rookie guard Erick Strickland. Under new head coach Jim Cleamons, the Mavericks struggles continued with a 4–10 start in November. With the team not showing any improvement, they traded All-Star guard Jason Kidd to the Phoenix Suns in exchange for second-year star Michael Finley, Sam Cassell and A.C. Green in late December. The Mavericks continued to struggle as they held a 16–28 record at the All-Star break.

Gatling played a sixth man role, averaging 19.1 points and 7.9 rebounds per game off the bench during the first half of the season, and was selected for the 1997 NBA All-Star Game. At midseason, he was traded along with Cassell, Montross, Jim Jackson and George McCloud to the New Jersey Nets in exchange for Shawn Bradley, Robert Pack, Khalid Reeves and second-year forward Ed O'Bannon, while Jamal Mashburn was dealt to the Miami Heat in exchange for second-year guard Sasha Danilovic, second-year forward Kurt Thomas, and rookie forward Martin Muursepp, and Miller was released to free agency, and re-signed as a free agent with his former team, the Toronto Raptors. In February, former Milwaukee Bucks and Golden State Warriors coach Don Nelson became the team's General Manager. The Mavericks suffered an 11-game losing streak between March and April, and lost 16 of their final 18 games, finishing fourth in the Midwest Division with a 24–58 record.

For the players who were acquired in trades during the season, Finley averaged 15.6 points per game in 56 games with the Mavericks, while Bradley averaged 14.6 points, 8.7 rebounds and 2.7 blocks per game in 32 games, Pack contributed 11.5 points, 6.4 assists and 1.8 steals per game in 20 games, and Green contributed 7.9 points and 9.1 rebounds per game in 56 games. In addition, for the players who spent the entire season with the Mavericks this season, Harper provided with 10.0 points and 4.3 assists per game, and Strickland contributed 10.6 points per game in only just 28 games. Following the season, Harper and O'Bannon were both traded to the Orlando Magic, who released O'Bannon to free agency, and Danilovic was released after just two seasons in the NBA.

On April 6, 1997, the Mavericks only scored just two points in the third quarter in an 87–80 road loss to the Los Angeles Lakers. It was the fewest points scored in a quarter of a game in NBA history.

Offseason

Draft picks

Roster

Roster Notes
 Center Shawn Bradley holds both American and German citizenship.
 Power forward Kurt Thomas was acquired from the Miami Heat at midseason, but did not play with the Mavericks this season due to an ankle injury.

Regular season

Season standings

z - clinched division title
y - clinched division title
x - clinched playoff spot

Record vs. opponents

Game log

Player statistics

Awards and records

Transactions

References

See also
 1996-97 NBA season

Dallas Mavericks seasons
Dallas
Dallas
Dallas